Alberto Vernet Basualdo (born June 8, 1982) is an Argentine rugby union player. His position is hooker. He started playing in Buenos Aires for Asociación Alumni and for Toulouse in France four years; he also played for the Argentine national rugby team, his debut for Los Pumas was on December 4, 2004.

In 2005 he suffered a career threatening neck injury displacing the 5th vertebra and the Intervertebral disc, but he recovered and was selected to represent Argentina at the 2007 Rugby World Cup. He joined Toulouse after the end of the tournament. In 2010 he was a replacement for the final as Toulouse won the Heineken Cup.

References

External links
UAR profile
RWC 2007 profile

1982 births
Living people
Rugby union players from Buenos Aires
Argentine rugby union players
Rugby union hookers
Expatriate rugby union players in France
Argentina international rugby union players
Asociación Alumni players
Stade Toulousain players
Argentine expatriate rugby union players
Argentine expatriate sportspeople in France